Charles Douglas-Compton, 3rd Marquess of Northampton, DL (26 May 1816 – 3 March 1877), styled Earl Compton from birth until 1851, was a British peer.

Early life
Born Charles Compton at Parliament Street, London, he was the son of Spencer Compton, 2nd Marquess of Northampton and his wife Margaret, eldest daughter of William Douglas-Maclean-Clephane. In 1831, a year after the death of his mother, he assumed the additional surname Douglas by sign manual. Douglas-Compton succeeded his father as marquess in 1851.

He was educated at Trinity College, Cambridge, where he graduated with a Master of Arts in 1837. In 1850, he received an Honorary Doctorate of Civil Law from the University of Oxford.

Career
Douglas-Compton was appointed a deputy lieutenant for Argyllshire in 1841. He was a trustee of the National Gallery (London). Douglas-Compton inherited Compton Wynyates in Warwickshire and in 1867 he assigned Sir Matthew Digby Wyatt to restore it.

Personal life
In 1859, he married Theodosia, daughter of Henry Vyner and granddaughter of Robert Vyner, MP for Lincolnshire. Their marriage was childless and Douglas-Compton was succeeded in his titles by his younger brother William.

References

1816 births
1877 deaths
Alumni of Trinity College, Cambridge
Deputy Lieutenants of Argyllshire
Charles
Marquesses of Northampton (1812 creation)